Halichoeres binotopsis, or the Saowisata wrasse, is a species of salt water wrasse found in the Western Pacific Ocean from Singapore to Western New Guinea, Indonesia and Papua New Guinea.

Size

References

binotopsis
Taxa named by Pieter Bleeker
Fish described in 1849